Portia Duval-Rigby (born 3 September 1970 in Townsville, Queensland) is an Australian retired ice dancer. With her husband Francis Rigby, she is a two time Australian Champion. They were married in 1997. The Rigbys were coached by Helen Ma and Svetlana Liapina. Their highest placement at an ISU Championship was 12th at the 1999 and 2001 Four Continents Championships.

Rigby previously skated with Andrejs Liepinieks, with whom she competed at the 1989 World Junior Figure Skating Championships. She is a civil engineer.

Competitive highlights
(with Rigby)

References

External links
 
 Tracings.net profile

Australian female ice dancers
1970 births
Living people